Time Peace: The Rascals' Greatest Hits is a greatest hits album from the Rascals, released on June 24, 1968. It reached number one on the Billboard Pop Albums chart by September 1968.  It also topped the Cash Box albums chart with a run in the Top 10 for 20 consecutive weeks

Release
The album is the only such compilation released during the group's active career. Although billed to their later name, most of the material came from when the group was known as the Young Rascals.  It contains all their singles through 1968's earlier "A Beautiful Morning", as well as some of their R&B treatments from early in their career.

Time Peace was reissued on CD by Atlantic Records in 1990, but subsequently went out of print. It was then reissued as part of the 2003 limited edition Rhino Handmade 6-CD collection All I Really Need: The Atlantic Recordings 1965-1971, which is also now out of print.

Cover
Packaging consisted of a gatefold album cover with front and back consisting of dot-based newspaper cartoon-style drawing of the four group members, with song titles in speech balloons; the interior gave complete song credits on one side, and an ensemble photograph on the other side whose artsy nature and 1968-style dress, together with the album's punning title, foretold the thematic and artistic direction the group was about to undertake.

Reception

Time Peace was the group's most commercially successful album, reaching number one on the Billboard Pop Albums chart by September 1968.  It also topped the Cash Box albums chart with a run in the Top 10 for 20 consecutive weeks.  Moreover, showing the group's white soul label was well earned, Time Peace also reached number four on the Billboard Black Albums chart.  It was RIAA-certified as a gold record on September 4, 1968.

Music critic Robert Christgau regarded the album as representative of New York City's rock music at the time, and later included it in his "Basic Record Library" of 1950s and 1960s recordings, published in Christgau's Record Guide: Rock Albums of the Seventies (1981).

Track listing

Side One
 "I Ain't Gonna Eat Out My Heart Anymore" (Pam Sawyer, Lori Burton) – 2:41
 The Rascals' first single (Atlantic #2312, 1965); also included on the 1966 album The Young Rascals
 "Good Lovin'" (Rudy Clark, Arthur Resnick) – 2:28
 The Rascals' second single (Atlantic #2321, 1966), and first #1 hit; also included on The Young Rascals
 "You Better Run" (Felix Cavaliere, Eddie Brigati) – 2:25
 The A-side of the Rascals' third single (Atlantic #2338, 1966); later included on the 1967 album Groovin'
 "Come On Up" (Cavaliere) – 2:41
 The Rascals' fourth single (Atlantic #2353, 1966), also included on the 1967 album Collections
 "Mustang Sally" (Bonny Rice) – 3:59
 Uncut version from The Young Rascals
 "Love is a Beautiful Thing" (Cavaliere, Brigati) – 2:30
 Originally released as the B-side of "You Better Run"; later included on Collections
 "In the Midnight Hour" (Wilson Pickett, Steve Cropper) – 4:00
 From The Young Rascals

Side Two
 "(I've Been) Lonely Too Long" (Cavaliere) – 2:57
 Uncut version from Collections
 "Groovin'" (Cavaliere, Brigati) – 2:25
 The Rascals' second #1 single (Atlantic #2401), released in 1967; also included on Groovin'
 "A Girl Like You" (Cavaliere, Brigati) – 2:46
 The follow-up Top 10 single to "Groovin'" (Atlantic #2424, 1967); also included on Groovin'
 "How Can I Be Sure" (Cavaliere, Brigati) – 2:50
 The Rascals' third Top 10 single of 1967 (Atlantic #2438); also included on Groovin'
 "It's Wonderful" (Cavaliere, Brigati) – 2:40
 LP version (without the "Mardi Gras" special effects coda) from the 1968 album Once Upon a Dream
 "Easy Rollin'" (Cavaliere, Brigati) – 2:55
 From Once Upon a Dream
 "A Beautiful Morning" (Cavaliere, Brigati) – 2:32
 Non-LP single from 1968 (Atlantic #2493)

Personnel

The Rascals
 Felix Cavaliere – vocals, keyboards
 Eddie Brigati – vocals, percussion
 Gene Cornish – vocals, guitar
 Dino Danelli – drums

Chart positions

Certifications
US-Gold (500,000 copies sold).

References

Further reading

External links 
 

1968 greatest hits albums
The Rascals albums
Albums produced by Tom Dowd
Albums produced by Arif Mardin
Atlantic Records compilation albums